Marbury may refer to:

Places
Marbury, Cheshire, United Kingdom
Marbury, Alabama, United States
Marbury, Maryland, United States

Other
Marbury (surname)
Justice Marbury (disambiguation)
Marbury Hall (disambiguation)
Marbury School (disambiguation)